Alexandra Camenscic (born 28 August 1988) is a Moldovan cross-country skier who has competed since 2009. She finished 71st in the 10 km event at the 2010 Winter Olympics in Vancouver.

Brice finished 84th in the individual sprint event at the FIS Nordic World Ski Championships 2009 in Liberec.

Her best career finish was tenth in a 7.5 km mass start event at Slovakia in 2009.

References

1988 births
Cross-country skiers at the 2010 Winter Olympics
Cross-country skiers at the 2014 Winter Olympics
Biathletes at the 2014 Winter Olympics
Living people
Moldovan female cross-country skiers
Olympic cross-country skiers of Moldova
Olympic biathletes of Moldova
Moldovan female biathletes